East Valley High School may refer to:

 East Valley High School (Spokane, Washington), Spokane, Washington
 East Valley High School (Yakima, Washington), Yakima, Washington
 East Valley High School (California), Los Angeles, California
 Redlands East Valley High School, Redlands, California